Pro Boxing is a 1985 video game published by Artworx.

Gameplay
Pro Boxing is a game in which the player challenges the computer or another player using boxers with equal capabilities.

Reception
Rick Teverbaugh reviewed the game for Computer Gaming World, and stated that "For those of you who aren't really sure whether boxing on a computer is for you, this is an inexpensive way to find out. I think you'll like it."

References

External links
Article in Commodore Microcomputers

1985 video games
Artworx games